The 2010 IHF Women's Youth World Championship was the third edition and took place at Santo Domingo in the Dominican Republic from August 2–12. The defending champion was Russia. Sweden won the title this year.

Preliminary round
Top 2 teams from each group advanced to the Quarterfinals, while the third placed team from each group competed for the places 9–12, the fourth placed teams for the place 13-16 and fifth placed team of each group for the place 17–20.

Group A

All times are local UTC-4

Group B

 withdrew from this Youth World Championship and all matches in which was scheduled to play will be canceled without evaluation.

All times are local UTC-4

Group C

All times are local UTC-4

Group D

All times are local UTC-4

Placement matches

17th–20th

17th/18th

13th–16th

15th/16th

13th/14th

9th–12th

11th/12th

9th/10th

Final round

{{Round8-with third
|RD1 = Quarterfinal
|RD2 = Semifinal
|RD3 = Final
|Consol = Third place

|August 9 – Santo Domingo ||28||24
|August 9 – Santo Domingo ||24||22
|August 9 – Santo Domingo ||26||23
|August 9 – Santo Domingo ||23||31

|August 11 – Santo Domingo ||21||38
|August 11 – Santo Domingo ||22||18

|August 12 – Santo Domingo ||34||29
|August 12 – Santo Domingo ||27||26
}}

Quarterfinals

5th–8th

7th/8th

5th/6th

Semifinals

Bronze medal match

Gold medal match

Final standings

Awards

All-star teamGoalkeeper: Left wing: Left back: Pivot: Centre back: Right back: Right wing:'''

References

External links
IHF Site

2010
World
International handball competitions hosted by the Dominican Republic
World Youth Women's Handball Championship, 2010
Women's handball in the Dominican Republic
Youth World Handball Championship